Miniclip SA is a mobile game publisher and former browser game website that launched in 2001. It was started by Robert Small and Tihan Presbie with a budget of £40,000. In 2008, the company was valued at over £275 million.

In 2009, Miniclip hosted over 400 applications on its website.

In 2015, Tencent acquired majority stakes of Miniclip. In December 2016, Miniclip achieved 1 billion downloads across its mobile games on iOS, Android, and Windows devices. In March 2022, Miniclip announced that it had reached 4 billion downloads, with 8 Ball Pool alone accounting for 1 billion.

In April 2022, Miniclip announced that it would begin prioritizing its mobile games. As a result, the browser game portal was shut down in July 2022 and the website lost all but its two most popular games, Agar.io and 8 Ball Pool.

In June 2022, Miniclip acquired SYBO, the publisher of Subway Surfers, in an undisclosed deal.

Studios

Mobile games
Miniclip has developed and published numerous mobile games for iOS, Android, Symbian, and Windows Phone. This includes: 8 Ball Pool, Golf Battle, Gravity Guy, Bloons Tower Defense, Plague Inc. for Android, Berry Rush, Agar.io, Diep.io, Mini Militia, and Ludo Party. Miniclip’s removal of Golf Battle Rush Mode has been met with much criticism.

Xbox games for Windows 8
In September 2012, Microsoft announced on the Windows blog on 31 August 2012 (see also List of Xbox games on Windows) that Miniclip games will be able to distribute their games on the Xbox division of Windows 8. Miniclip games that are supported by Xbox for Windows 8 include Gravity Guy, iStunt 2, and Monster Island. Gravity Guy was released on Windows Store on 29 November 2010.

In April 2013, most Miniclip games for Windows 8 and Windows Phone were distributed for free for one year.

Xbox One, PC, and PS4

On 14 February 2017, Miniclip released their first game compatible with Xbox One, PC, and PlayStation 4, titled MX Nitro.

Malicious software issues
On 1 September 2005, the United States Computer Emergency Readiness Team issued an advisory concerning Miniclip:

In 2006, several security firms reported that some Miniclip users had installed a "miniclipgameloader.dll" which contained the hostile code identified as "Trojan Downloader 3069.” In the same year, another download related to Miniclip installed "High Risk" malware called "Trojan-Downloader.CR64Loader.”

References

Mini Militia

External links
 

Browser-based game websites
Swiss websites
Mobile content
Internet properties established in 2001
IOS games
Android (operating system) games
Windows Phone games
Tencent divisions and subsidiaries
2001 establishments in Switzerland
2015 mergers and acquisitions